Thiriyuzhichil is a dance ritual performed by Pulluvas in Kerala (South India) to alleviate the fear of snakes, to appease the snake and to be blessed with babies. This is more popular in the districts of Trichur, Calicut and Palghat and it is performed in Hindu Temples and shrines meant for snakes. By performing this, the queen of snakes could be appeased. The performer starts dancing holding a torch in his hand using various types of music instruments.

Thiri Uzhichchil is also performed as one of the items in Ayyappan Vilakku festival. This item is performed early morning at about 3 am after the Ayappa Jananam (Birth of Ayyappa) ritual and the Paal kindi ezhunnaLLippu (ritual procession of Ayyappa bringing tiger's milk).

In the case of Thiri Uzhichchil in Ayyappan viLakku, the accompaniments are ilaththaaLam(cymbal) and Chenda (traditional Keralite drum). The Velichapaadu after uranju thuLLal (trance-like shivering and jumping continuously) starts with one thiri (flaming torch)  and increases it to two and three and even goes up to five thiris. 
The thiri or pandam is a flaming torch made of group of cotton wicks strapped together by coconut leaf fronds.  The wicks are fuelled by coconut oil, into which
they are dipped before the performance.

He wipes the flames on the body especially the arms, chest and back continuously dancing to the tune of the drums.

The dance is a form of worship, Nrithya Pooja, on the eight sides of the ambalam (shrine) - in case of Ayyappan ViLakku the temple is constructed purely with banana stems without using any metallic items -  with intricate steps and each section of the dance, ending with a crescendo on one of the eight sides.

In addition to wiping the flames on the body, the performer also sticks the torch into the waist part of the kachcha (traditional dress) both on front and back side so that the flames almost touches his chin. The crescendo of the drumming and the dance culminates when
he wipes the torch so vigorously on his arms, chest and back that it almost goes out.
After the performance the performer offers the torch to all the spectator devotees to warm their palms and touch the palms to their faces (just like the traditional way Hindus take the camphor offering).

The Velichappadu usually wears the white dothi and both red and black kachcha and also ties up the "waist belt of bells" (aramaNi) during the performance.

See also
 Arts of Kerala
 Kerala Folklore Academy

Dances of Kerala